In enzymology, an acetoin racemase is an enzyme that catalyzes the chemical reaction

(S)-acetoin  (R)-acetoin

This enzyme belongs to the family of isomerases, specifically those racemases and epimerases acting on hydroxy acids and derivatives.  The systematic name of this enzyme class is acetoin racemase. This enzyme is also called acetylmethylcarbinol racemase.  This enzyme participates in butanoate metabolism.

References 

 

EC 5.1.2
Enzymes of unknown structure